The Parable is a public artwork by American artist Jimilu Mason, located at The Festival Center at 1640 Columbia Road, N.W. in Washington, D.C., United States. The Parable was originally surveyed as part of the Smithsonian's Save Outdoor Sculpture! survey in 1993.

Description

The bronze sculpture shows a man seated on a large cinder block and at his feet is a carpenter's square. Dressed in only a shirt and pants, his shirt sleeves are rolled up above his elbows and his collar is open. His face wears a beard and mustache and his feet are shoe-less. His arms reach out in front of him, and he looks as if in conversation.

Information

According to Mason the sculpture "represents a Christ... teaching that there is more than brick and mortar to building a city. The leaders must be good servants."

Condition

This sculpture was surveyed in 1993 for its condition and it was described that "treatment needed".

See also

The Servant Christ
List of statues of Jesus

References

Outdoor sculptures in Washington, D.C.
Statues of Jesus
1990 sculptures
Bronze sculptures in Washington, D.C.